Are You the One? Come One, Come All is the eight season of MTV's reality dating series Are You the One?. It was filmed in Kona, Hawaii and premiered on June 26, 2019. For the first time on Are You the One?, all cast members were Bisexual, with no gender limitations on their potential perfect matches.

Cast

Progress 

Notes 
 = Unconfirmed perfect match

In episode 7, it was shown onscreen that Basit and Jonathan were a perfect match. This marked the first time in the series' history that the audience was given information that was unknown to the house.

Truth Booths

Episodes

{{Episode table |background=#F87217 |overall=5 |season=5 |title=30 |airdate=20 |country= U.S. |viewers=10 |episodes=
{{Episode List
|EpisodeNumber= 7778
|EpisodeNumber2= 12
|Title = Come One, Come All
|OriginalAirDate= 
|ShortSummary =  16 singles arrive in Hawaii searching for their perfect match and find out they are all sexually fluid. Amber and Nour are attracted to one another, but Nour then chooses go on a date with Justin. Kai opens up to Jenna about being a transmasculine non-binary person and they have sex for the first time, only for Kai to have sex with Remy shortly after.|Viewers         = 0.29 (MTV)0.29 (VH1)0.25 (MTV)0.23 (VH1)
|LineColor = F87217
}}
{{Episode list
 |EpisodeNumber= 79
 |EpisodeNumber2= 3
 |Title = This is Trash
 |OriginalAirDate=
 |Viewers = 0.33
 |ShortSummary = Jonathan reveals he is into masculine guys and Basit does not feel accepted by him. Max opens up to Justin about not embracing his bisexuality. |LineColor = F87217
}}
{{Episode list
 |EpisodeNumber= 80
 |EpisodeNumber2= 4
 |Title = We Come to Slay
 |OriginalAirDate=
 |Viewers = 0.35
 |ShortSummary = Jenna thinks her and Kai are not a perfect match and they end up fighting, after going on a date together they manage to rekindle their relationship, but the other singles think they are toxic for one another and vote them into the Truth Booth hoping for a definite answer. Nour is jealous of Amber, but later upsets her by kissing Kylie. The house throws a queer prom. 
 |LineColor = F87217
}}
{{Episode list
 |EpisodeNumber= 81
 |EpisodeNumber2= 5
 |Title = There Was a Fivesome?
 |OriginalAirDate=
 |Viewers = 0.51
 |ShortSummary = Jenna gets closer to Danny, but she is still unable to forget Kai. Kari is convinced Kylie is her perfect match, but she is disappointed when she finds out about Kylie participating in a fivesome without her. Max gets angry at Justin after seeing him kissing Aasha, but he manages to forgive him. |LineColor = F87217
}}
{{Episode list
 |EpisodeNumber= 82
 |EpisodeNumber2= 6
 |Title = Hate to Burst Your Bubble
 |OriginalAirDate=
 |Viewers = 0.40
 |ShortSummary = Jasmine and Kai are attracted to each other, they hook up in the bathroom and Jenna is not happy about it. Kari and Kylie are voted into the truth booth and the whole house is shocked when they are revealed not to be a perfect match. Jonathan's inability to forget Justin and Nour's confidence in her and Amber being a perfect match end up causing the first black-out ceremony and costing the house $ 250,000. |LineColor = F87217
}}
{{Episode list
 |EpisodeNumber= 83
 |EpisodeNumber2= 7
 |Title = Red Flag Alert
 |OriginalAirDate=
 |Viewers = 0.43
 |ShortSummary = After the black-out, Jonathan is finally ready to get to know Basit and the two develop a connection. Despite not forgetting Jenna, Kai grows closer to Nour, and also kisses Danny. Amber tries to move on with Jenna.

Perfect Match #1:  Brandon & Aasha
Perfect Match #2:  Jonathan & Basit |LineColor = F87217
}}
{{Episode list
 |EpisodeNumber= 84
 |EpisodeNumber2= 8
 |Title = This Sucks and Blows
 |OriginalAirDate=
 |Viewers = 0.20
 |ShortSummary = Remy is attracted by Paige, but she does not seem to reciprocate. Kai is developing bonds with Jasmine, Nour and Danny, but does not feel ready for commitment yet. This angers Nour, that decides to confront Jasmine about it, but the situation escalates. |LineColor = F87217
}}
{{Episode list
 |EpisodeNumber= 85
 |EpisodeNumber2= 9
 |Title = Games Players Play
 |OriginalAirDate=
 |Viewers = 0.35
 |ShortSummary = After the fight between Nour and Jasmine, Kai goes back to Jenna and says he loves her, but Jenna rejects him. The other singles are proud of Jenna for standing her ground, and are also tired of Kai's behaviour. |LineColor = F87217
}}
{{Episode list
 |EpisodeNumber= 86
 |EpisodeNumber2= 10
 |Title = It All Comes Down to Jax
 |OriginalAirDate=
 |Viewers = 0.23
 |ShortSummary = After another unsuccessful truth booth, the singles start analyzing past match-up ceremonies and figure out that Nour and Jasmine are a perfect match, the two try to move past their drama and find out they have a lot in common. Amber likes Justin and starts thinking that him and Max are not actually a match and that Danny and Kai are instead. |LineColor = F87217
}}
{{Episode list
 |EpisodeNumber= 87
 |EpisodeNumber2= 11
 |Title = On to the Next
 |OriginalAirDate=
 |Viewers = 0.24
 |ShortSummary = Max is devastated to find out that he and Justin are not a perfect match, while Paige and Jenna discover that they actually are a match. This leaves six people without a partner: Kylie, Kari, Remy, Max, Justin and Amber. Max starts thinking Kari could be his match, and Kylie prepares a romantic surprise for Amber. |LineColor = F87217
}}
{{Episode list
 |EpisodeNumber= 88
 |EpisodeNumber2= 12
 |Title = All or Nothing
 |OriginalAirDate=
 |Viewers = 0.22
 |ShortSummary = After another unsuccessful Truth Booth, the house is desperate to find the last three matches. Amber reconnects with Justin, but she is not sure whether her perfect match is him or Remy. |LineColor = F87217
}}
}}

Reception
The season received generally favorable reviews. Critics praise the show's diverse cast with The Atlantic describing it as a "fascinating tonal mashup". When compared to other dating reality shows such as Paradise Hotel, Temptation Island, and Love Island, The Daily Beast described Are you the One? as the "best of these".

Awards 
This season received a GLAAD Media Award for Outstanding Reality Program in 2020. It was nominated for a Critics' Choice Real TV Awards for Relationship Show.

After filming 
While this season did not include an official reunion episode, a majority of the season's cast members opted to participate in a reunion special hosted by AfterBuzz TV and confirmed a number of their post-finale relationship statuses.

The Challenge

References

Are You the One?
2019 American television seasons
Bisexuality-related television series
LGBT in Hawaii